Pitcairnia decidua is a plant species in the genus Pitcairnia. This species is endemic to Brazil.

References

decidua
Flora of Brazil